Dreaming of You is the fifth and final studio album by American singer Selena. Released posthumously on July 18, 1995, by EMI Latin and EMI Records, it was an immediate commercial and critical success, debuting atop the United States Billboard 200—the first predominately Spanish-language album to do so. It sold 175,000 copies on its first day of release in the U.S.—a then-record for a female vocalist. With first week sales of 331,000 units, it became the second-highest first-week sales for a female musician since Nielsen Soundscan began monitoring album sales in 1991. Billboard magazine declared it a "historic" event, while Time said the recording elevated Selena's music to a wider audience. It won Album of the Year at the 1996 Tejano Music Awards and Female Pop Album of the Year at the 3rd annual Billboard Latin Music Awards.

After signing a recording contract with EMI Latin in 1989, the label denied Selena a requested crossover after she made three demonstration recordings. After her Grammy Award nomination for Live (1993) was announced, Selena signed with SBK Records to begin recording her crossover album, which was front-page news in Billboard magazine. In March 1994, she released Amor Prohibido; in interviews she said her English-language album was still being developed. Recording sessions for Dreaming of You began in December 1994; Selena recorded four tracks slated for the album. On March 31, 1995, she was murdered by Yolanda Saldívar, the former manager of her Selena Etc. boutiques over a dispute about claims of embezzlement.

The album contains some previously released material, as well as some unreleased English and Spanish-language tracks that were recorded between 1992 and 1995. The tracks are a mixture of American pop and Latin music, with the first half of Dreaming of You containing English-language R&B and pop ballads, while the latter half profiles Selena's Latin-themed repertoire, making this her only album to feature English-language songs instead of exclusively Spanish-language songs as with her past four albums. Six tracks from the album were released as singles. The first four singles, "I Could Fall in Love", "Tú Sólo Tú", "Techno Cumbia", and "Dreaming of You", charted within the top ten on the U.S. charts. The title track became Selena's highest-charting Billboard Hot 100 single of her career, peaking at number twenty-two.

Dreaming of You was among the top ten best-selling debuts for a musician, best-selling debut by a female act and the fastest-selling U.S. album of 1995. It has since been ranked among the best and most important recordings produced during the rock and roll era. Media outlets have since ranked the recording among the best posthumous releases. When Dreaming of You peaked at number one, Tejano music entered the mainstream market. Music critics said the general population of the U.S. would not have known about Tejano or Latin music had it not been for Dreaming of You. The Recording Industry Association of America (RIAA) certified the record 59x platinum (Latin field), with sales of 3.549 million album-equivalent units in the U.S.. The album was eventually certified gold by Music Canada and by Asociación Mexicana de Productores de Fonogramas y Videogramas (AMPROFON). , the album has sold five million copies worldwide. With sales of three million copies, it is the best-selling Latin album of all-time in the U.S. .

Background

In the 1960s, Selena's father Abraham Quintanilla, Jr. became the third vocalist of Los Dinos, a group composed of Mexican Americans. The band began their careers playing English-language doo-wop music. White Americans were offended that a Mexican American band was singing "their type of music". After a crowd of Mexican-Americans ran Los Dinos out of a nightclub for singing English-language songs, the band decided to perform music of their heritage. Los Dinos found success recording and performing Spanish-language songs and their popularity grew. Quintanilla, Jr. left the band in the 1970s after fathering his third child, Selena. After discovering Selena could sing, he quickly organized his children into a band called Selena y Los Dinos. Despite wanting to record English-language songs, the band recorded Tejano music compositions; a male-dominated, Spanish-language genre with German influences of polka, jazz, and country music that was popular with Mexicans living in the United States. The band was often turned down by Texas music venues because of the members' ages and because Selena was the lead singer.

Rick Trevino, founder of the Tejano Music Awards, originally approached La Sombra as the opening act for the 1989 awards ceremony, following Selena y Los Dinos. The band's lead vocalist Frank Sunie declined the offer, telling Trevino he "doesn't open up for anybody". Trevino then called Quintanilla, Jr. to ask him to open the ceremony. Quintanilla, Jr. immediately accepted the offer, saying it was "the best time, because everyone is sober. They're sober they're listening to the artist and the music." Unbeknown to Quintanilla, Jr and Selena, the new head of Sony Music Latin and José Behar, who had recently launched EMI Latin Records, were attending the awards ceremony and were scouting for new Latin acts. Behar wanted to sign Selena to EMI's label Capitol Records, while Sony Music Latin was offering Quintanilla, Jr. twice Capitol's sum. Behar thought he had discovered the next Gloria Estefan, but his superior called Behar illogical since he had only been in Texas for a week. Quintanilla, Jr. chose EMI Latin's offer because of the potential for a crossover, and he wanted his children to be the first musicians to sign with the company.

Before Selena signed her contract with EMI Latin in 1989, Behar and Stephen Finfer requested Selena for an English-language debut album. She was asked to make three demonstration recordings for Charles Koppelman, chairman of EMI Records. After reviewing them, Koppelman declined a crossover attempt, believing Selena should first strengthen her fan base. In a 2007 interview, Behar spoke about the difficulty of recording Selena's English-language debut. He said EMI "had let all of us to believe that she would record in English, and it just wasn't materializing for whatever reason". Behar said the record company "didn't believe, they didn't think it could happen", and continuously told Selena and her father "it wasn't the right time" for an English-language debut.

Selena signed a record deal with EMI subsidiary SBK Records in November 1993, following her Grammy Award nomination for Live (1993). The news of the singer's record deal was front-page news in Billboard magazine. In a 1994 meeting, Selena expressed her guilt to Behar; Selena had told interviewers of her upcoming crossover album and told them the recording was expected to be released soon. At the time, Selena had not recorded a single song for her planned English-language debut. Behar subsequently told Koppelman that Selena and her band would leave EMI and find a record company willing to record an English-language album for Selena. Behar had lied to the chairman to force the crossover album to begin; EMI relented and the recording sessions began. Selena said she felt intimidated by the recording deal because the situation was new to her and only a few people had believed she would achieve success in the pop market.

Recording and production 

According to Betty Cortina of People magazine, Dreaming of You marked a shift that abrogated the singer being marketed as part of her band and billed Selena as an American solo artist in "the most fundamental way for her". From 1989, Selena's brother A.B. Quintanilla became Selena's principal music producer and songwriter, and remained so throughout her career. Because Quintanilla III was working on the singer's follow-up recording to Amor Prohibido (1994), he could not produce the crossover album. He was asked to meet with several producers in New York and choose one who would best "fit with Selena's style". Dreaming of You was the first album Selena's family did not produce. They had decided to step down before the recording sessions and allow professional pop producers to work with her. Quintanilla III and Selena flew to Nashville, Tennessee, and met with Keith Thomas, who had prepared the instrumental parts for the song called "I Could Fall in Love" but had not yet completed the vocal parts, so he sang it for them. Selena and Quintanilla III immediately liked it; Quintanilla III said he wanted Selena to include it on her album.  Recording sessions began in December 1994 at The Bennett House in Franklin, Tennessee; Selena had to return later when Thomas could provide additional vocals. Selena and her husband Chris Pérez arrived at the studio on March 24, 1995, to finish recording the song. In a 2002 interview, Pérez said Thomas provided Selena with a cassette of "I Could Fall in Love" and said she had the song "on loop" and she "must have heard it a hundred times". He believed it had an "effect on her" because "she went into the studio the next day to actually do the recording and just was nailing things left and right and [Thomas] was letting her do her thing and I mean it was an incredible thing to watch".
 

EMI Records, which had more experience in the pop market, headed the project and allowed Selena to choose one song that she liked. Her sister and drummer of the band, Suzette Quintanilla, said in a 1997 interview that the singer carefully chose a song that represented what "Selena was all about". She chose "Dreaming of You", which was written by American songwriters Franne Golde and Tom Snow in 1989 for American R&B group The Jets, who rejected it.  According to Snow, Golde "never gave up on the tune and eventually got it to Selena". When Quintanilla III heard the demonstration recording, he told Selena he did not like the track. Selena told him she was going to record it because she favored its lyrical content and message. In a 2002 interview, Quintanilla III said he was "more judgmental" on his first impression of the demonstration recording than the song itself and cited its medley, content, and song structure for changing his mind.

Selena began recording "Dreaming of You" on March 5, 1995, at Quintanilla, Jr.'s recording label Q-Productions in Corpus Christi, Texas. During the recording session, Selena was suffering from bronchitis. Her father asked her to "just try" and sing the song because several producers had arrived from Los Angeles to watch her record the track. After the recording session, the producers liked Selena's vocal range in the song and decided to use her first take. American producer Guy Roche produced and arranged the piece along with "Captive Heart". After the arrangement for "Dreaming of You", Selena wanted Pérez to hear the finished product. He was unable to attend after Quintanilla, Jr. wanted him to work with a band he was interested in managing. In 2012, Pérez wrote in his book about his and Selena's relationship that he regretted not going to the recording session.

The album was scheduled to be completed in time for a projected release in September or October 1995, and songs to be earmarked for recording and possible inclusion for the album included "Oh No (I'll Never Fall in Love Again)" and "Are You Ready to Be Loved?"; rehearsal tapes for these songs were later released on SelenaQRadio in September and December 2015 respectively.

Selena recorded "God's Child (Baila Conmigo)", a duet with David Byrne that was included on the soundtrack of the comedy film Blue in the Face (1995). Byrne said the song was the last recording Selena made before she was shot and killed by Yolanda Saldívar, her friend and former manager of her Selena Etc. boutiques, on March 31, 1995. In the aftermath, EMI Records and EMI Latin put aside  ($784,000 2015 USD) to complete Dreaming of You. Behar said promotion "will be on the superstar scale" and claimed "[we] didn't put this marketing campaign behind it because there was a tragedy. We put this marketing campaign behind it because we believed that this was going to be a huge album because of the music. This is a record that we're going to work over the next 10 months."

Music and lyrics 

Dreaming of You is a multigenre work of American pop and Latin music. It incorporates the diverse stylistic influences of techno, hip-hop, pop rock, dance-pop, regional Mexican music, Tejano, R&B, disco, and flamenco music. The first half of the album comprises R&B and pop ballads, while the remainder contains Latin-themed influences that profile Selena's music career. Music journalists said producers who worked with Selena tried to caricature her with Paula Abdul, Amy Grant, Celine Dion, Whitney Houston, Mariah Carey, and Madonna. Newsweek magazine called Selena's English-language recordings "a blend of urban pop and Latin warmth". According to AllMusic's Stephen Erlewine, the album's mood is spicy, celebratory, and exuberant. "I Could Fall in Love" and "Dreaming of You" are lyrically identical; called "confessional ballads", both recordings speak of despair, heartbreak, and fear of rejection from a man the songs' narrators are falling in love with. The lyrics of "Dreaming of You" also explore feelings of longing and hope. Larry Flick of Billboard magazine wrote that "Dreaming of You"s idealistic lyrics have an "affecting poignancy that will not be lost on AC [radio]."

"God's Child (Baila Conmigo)" employs an off-beat rhythm that is energetic, dark, mysterious, and its lyrics suggest subterfuge and counter-hegemony. The song has elements of rumba, flamenco, rock, R&B, and Middle Eastern music. "Captive Heart" has 1980s funk; Achy Obejas of the Chicago Tribune said it was intended for contemporary hit radio. The disco house track "I'm Getting Used to You", which makes use of cha-cha, explores a volatile relationship. Mario Tarradell of The New London Day said "Captive Heart" and "I'm Getting Used to You" border on new jack swing—a popular R&B subgenre pioneered by Jade and Mary J. Blige. The producers of the soundtrack of the 1995 romantic comedy-drama film Don Juan DeMarco—in which Selena played a mariachi singer—decided not to include her recordings of "Tú Sólo Tú" and "El Toro Relajo". Christopher John Farley of Time magazine said the producers who excluded the songs regretted this move following the impact of Selena's death. According to Denise Segura and Patricia Zavella in their book Women and Migration in the U.S.-Mexico Borderlands: A Reader (2007), "Tú Sólo Tú"—a Pedro Infante cover—and "El Toro Relajo" are about unrequited love and were recorded in a ranchera-style. Selena recorded "Tú Sólo Tú" con ganas—a Spanish-language aphorism that translates to a performer singing with "unapologetic emotionality"; common among ranchera singers.

EMI Records, which wanted the 1992 track "Missing My Baby" and the 1994 single "Techno Cumbia" to be added to Dreaming of You, asked 
Quintanilla III to meet with R&B group Full Force in Manhattan. The group remixed both songs, added vocals to "Missing My Baby", and remixed the latter in a reggae style. Quintanilla, Jr. decided to add "Como la Flor" (1992), "Amor Prohibido" (1994), and "Bidi Bidi Bom Bom" (1994) to Dreaming of You. He pitched the idea of remixing the songs as though the band was singing them in concert, changing their beats slightly. Quintanilla III said the new versions of the tracks gave fans "something fresh" and that he thought the idea was "neat". "Como la Flor", credited as a career-launching single, expresses the sorrow of a woman whose lover has abandoned her for another partner while she wishes "nothing but the best" for him. "Amor Prohibido" is a Romeo & Juliet-esque Spanish-language dance-pop track. "Bidi Bidi Bom Bom", remixed into a reggae track, speaks of the narrator's heart palpitating whenever her love interest walks past her. The Barrio Boyzz was asked to record a bilingual version of their Spanish-language duet with Selena on "Donde Quiera Que Estés" (1994) called "Wherever You Are".

Singles 
Davitt Sigerson, the president and CEO of EMI Records, feared "I Could Fall in Love" might sell more copies than Dreaming of You, so he did not issue the single as a commercial release.  "I Could Fall in Love" was released promotionally to U.S. radio stations on June 26, 1995, at the same time as "Tú Sólo Tú" to demonstrate Selena's change from recording in Spanish to English. Fred Bronson of Billboard magazine said if EMI Latin had released "I Could Fall in Love" as a single and it had debuted in the top 40 of the U.S. Billboard Hot 100 chart, it would have been the first posthumous debut single to do so since "Pledging My Love" by Johnny Ace in 1955. "I Could Fall in Love" peaked at number eight on the U.S. Billboard Hot 100 Airplay chart, and at number one on the U.S. Latin Pop Songs chart. "Tú Sólo Tú" and "I Could Fall in Love" occupied the first and second positions respectively on U.S. Hot Latin Tracks for five consecutive weeks. Selena thus became the first artist to have both a Spanish-language and an English-language song in the top ten of that chart. "I Could Fall in Love" became the fifth-highest-charting song on that chart in 1995 and remained the highest-charting English-language song for two years, until Celine Dion's 1998 single "My Heart Will Go On" exceeded it when it peaked at number one. "Tú Sólo Tú" spent ten consecutive weeks at number one on the Hot Latin Tracks, becoming the most longevous number-one single of Selena's musical career. With "Tú Sólo Tú" and her other chart-topping singles from 1992 to her death in 1995, Selena's recordings spent 44 weeks at number one; the most for any Hispanic artist as of 2011.

On August 14, 1995, "Dreaming of You" was released as the album's lead single, with the remix version and a radio edit of "Techno Cumbia" as the b-side tracks. The single peaked at number twenty-two on the U.S. Billboard Hot 100 chart and sold 25,000 copies in its first week of availability; by 2010 it had sold 284,000 digital units. "Dreaming of You"  was the best-selling single of Selena's career; in 2003 it was the eighty-eighth best-selling Hot 100 single of all-time, according to Billboard and Nielsen SoundScan. The Los Angeles Times placed "Dreaming of You" at number five out of its top-ten singles of 1995. "Techno Cumbia" peaked at number four on the U.S. Hot Latin Tracks and the U.S. Regional Mexican Songs charts. On December 2, 1995, "El Toro Relajo" debuted and peaked at number twenty-four on the U.S. Hot Latin Tracks. "I'm Getting Used to You", the second commercially released single and the sixth single overall, was released on March 2, 1996. It debuted and peaked at number seven on the U.S. Billboard Bubbling Under Hot 100 Singles chart and at number one on the U.S. Billboard Dance/Electronic Singles Sales chart. "I'm Getting Used to You" later peaked at number twenty-three on the U.S. Billboard Adult Contemporary Tracks chart on the week ending June 8, 1996. The Billboard critics poll ranked the remix version of "I'm Getting Used to You" among their top ten singles of 1996.

"I Could Fall in Love", "Dreaming of You", and "I'm Getting Used to You" were less commercially successful outside the United States and Canada. "I Could Fall in Love" peaked at number one on the RPM Adult Contemporary Songs chart on the week ending November 6, 1996. "I Could Fall in Love" peaked at number five on the RPM Top 100 Singles chart. It was the only single by Selena to chart on the New Zealand Singles Chart, peaking at number ten. In 1996, "Dreaming of You" performed better in Canada on the RPM Adult Contemporary and the Top 100 Singles chart, peaking at numbers seven and thirty, respectively. "I'm Getting Used to You"  debuted at number ninety-six on the RPM Top 100 Singles chart on the week ending June 10, 1996, and became the third single by Selena to chart in Canada. After five weeks on the chart, "I'm Getting Used to You" peaked at number sixty-five. At number ninety-three, "I'm Getting Used to You", exited the Top 100 Singles chart after spending nine weeks on it.

Critical reception

The majority of contemporary reviews were positive. Stephen Thomas Erlewine of AllMusic said Dreaming of You was the first recording by Selena to have been heard by the general population of the United States because her death attracted American listeners to her album. This was echoed by Alisa Valdes of The Boston Globe. Erlewine said Amor Prohibido is "a more consistent release" and that Dreaming of You was not the singer's best work, and he called it an introductory effort. According to Erlewine, the English-language tracks  on the album "are no different than her Spanish songs"; he also said the album "would have been stronger" if the singer had lived. He finished his review by calling the album a "powerful—and touching—testament to her talents". John Lannert of Billboard magazine called the album's commercial success "hardly a fluke". Vibe magazine contributor Ed Morales, described the album as a summation of her cumbia-influenced songs, her Tex-Mex (Texas-Mexico) "excellence", and a "poignant glimpse" of the path the singer's musical career may have taken had she lived. Writing for Time magazine, David Browne said Dreaming of Yous release was "one of the quickest posthumous albums ever cobbled together". He said the producers who worked with Selena on the album had decisively paired her with recordings that reminded him of lighter versions of Paula Abdul and called them "greeting-card sentiments". He recognized the later half of Dreaming of You as "the true, unbridled Selena", calling them "traditional ballads or tropical fantasies, Selena evokes lust and passion"; illustrating that those qualities found on her English-language songs are absent from the Spanish-language ones.

Writing for the Chicago Tribune, Achy Obejas called the recording a fragmentary work and said it is "Selena's past and about what might have been". Obejas called the record "full of promise and flaws", and said its intentional bilingual nature was done by "necessity rather than design". She also said the album is a Latino crossover nix, citing Gloria Estefan's earlier mainstream work as the primitive Latino crossover; although Selena "didn't get to take the next step" as did Estefan. Objeas also wrote that the album is the opposite of a "masterpiece, or definitive, or even a testament to Selena's talents", but is more of a "smorgasbord". Objeas praised Selena's "complete ease on the R&B tunes" and thought she was "getting funky and pretty soulful". Enrique Lopetegui of Los Angeles Times said Dreaming of You is Selena's "most electric and satisfying album", and said it was an applicable "epitaph" for her. Lopetegui called the songs on the album "radio-friendly pop tunes" but said the album "lacks cohesion" and that he finds the bilingual album "even more interesting than the original idea". According to Lopetegui, Selena "blossoms into a full-fledged soul singer, with an aggressiveness seldom show before" on her English-language tracks but finds the rancheras "Tú Sólo Tú" and "El Toro Relajo" the "most impressive" and saying Selena was inexperienced with that style. Christopher John Farley of Time magazine said Dreaming of You elevated Selena's music "to a far wider audience than she ever had when she was alive". He said the album incorporates her "finest, most enjoyable work" and called it "a commendable but sorrowful accomplishment". Contrasting her Tejano and English-language songs, Farley wrote that Selena's Tejano recordings was sometimes clumsy, whereas her English pop songs were "sweet, pure and clear, and on the mariachi numbers, Selena shows off a voice that is sexy, strong and gracefully maturing".

Writing for the New York Daily News, Mary Talbot said listening to Dreaming of You was "akin to sifting through a dead woman's scrapbook" and called it "disparate jottings and snapshots some artful, some light, all weighted with nostalgia". Talbot said the album showcases "Selena's past and outlines what could have been her future", and because of the singer's death, the story is incomplete. She called the English offerings "sturdy, generic pop numbers" that would be favored among her Tejano following "but there aren't enough of them to prove her strength or breadth as an English-language artist". Talbot said Selena was skillful in crisscrossing "traditional Mexican music with a contemporary American pop sensibility, and that skill doesn't figure with these songs". Towards the end of her review, Talbot said Dreaming of You is "the effervescent pop of her generation". Mario Tarradell of The Dallas Morning News said the album "doesn't deliver", writing that Selena was "revamped to sound like one of pop radio's many generic female vocalist" and that her English recordings lack "the bubbly, effervescent personality, the chica-del-barrio charm" found on her Tejano songs. Tarradell said the English songs were "tepid imitations of Amy Grant and Abdul". Peter Watrous of The New York Times called Dreaming of You "a collection of leftovers" and said the Spanish-language songs "sound better" than Selena's English ones. Watrous said the producers did not ameliorate Selena's English-language tracks and gave their all. He further wrote that "the music is faceless commerce" but that Selena recorded them "so well on the album" that it suggested "she had a good chance of success, working lush ballads in an anonymous pop style that Disney has mastered". Rock music contributor Roger Catlin of the Hartford Courant described Dreaming of You as "a package that hints at the overall talent and immense potential of the young star". Catlin said her English-language works were lacking "technical heroics that have defined [Selena] in the '90s." but states the singer "is understandably assured" on her Spanish offerings. He said Selena was "low key" and that the material seemed that way because she had only recorded four English-language tracks before her death.

Accolades 
Dreaming of You was listed as the ninth "Top 10 Posthumous Albums" by Time magazine in 2010. It was named as the third-best posthumous album of all-time by BET, which called the recording a "heartbreaking testament to a young talent on the verge of superstardom". Vibe magazine ranked Dreaming of You the second-best posthumous release and described it as an "overview", Dreaming of You won Album of the Year at the 1996 Tejano Music Awards. At the 3rd Annual Billboard Latin Music Awards in 1996, Dreaming of You won Female Pop Album of the Year.

Release and commercial performance 
Dreaming of Yous U.S. release date was confirmed on June 10, 1995, to be July 18 that year. The album's release in European and Asian countries was delayed when EMI Records feared Selena's murder—rather than her music—would become the focal point of the recording. Adam Sexton, vice-president of EMI Records,  announced on August 5, 1995, that the album would be released in Germany on August 14 and in the rest of Europe in September. The album's release in Asia was set for October. Fans began lining up to purchase Dreaming of You hours before stores were due to open; within twenty-four hours 75% of all available copies of the album were sold. Although initial predictions placed Dreaming of You first sales at 400,000 copies, the album sold 331,000 units its first week and debuted atop the U.S. Billboard 200 chart, becoming the first and only predominately Spanish-language album to do so. This was the second-biggest release sales for a 1995 album, behind Michael Jackson's HIStory, and the second-largest first-week sales for a female musician, behind Janet Jackson's janet. (1993) since Nielsen SoundScan began monitoring album sales in 1991. Dreaming of You displaced Hootie & the Blowfish's Cracked Rear View from the top spot on the Billboard 200. The recording debuted atop the U.S. Billboard Top Latin Albums and the U.S. Billboard Latin Pop Albums charts, displacing Selena's 1994 album Amor Prohibido and the Gipsy Kings' Best of album, respectively.

In its second week, Dreaming of You fell to number three on the Billboard 200 chart, and remained there for two consecutive weeks. Sales of Dreaming of You continued to decrease, falling to number six in its fourth week. In its fifth week, Dreaming of You dropped to number eight. Starting in its sixth week, the album remained in the top twenty of the Billboard 200 chart. On the week ending October 28, 1995, sales of Dreaming of You rose 18% after an eighteen-week decline. This was followed by the highly publicized murder trial. The album remained on the Billboard 200 chart for forty-four consecutive weeks, exiting the chart at number 181 on the week ending June 1, 1996. Lannert predicted Dreaming of You would remain atop the Latin music charts until Selena's next posthumous release. It remained at number one for forty-two consecutive weeks until Enrique Iglesias displaced it with his self-titled debut album on the week ending May 25, 1996. Dreaming of You went on to become the best-selling Latin and Latin pop album of 1995 and 1996.

The recording finished as the forty-fourth album of the Billboard 200 of 1995 and finished at number 123 on the Billboard 200 albums of 1996. Two years after Selena's murder, Dreaming of You and Siempre Selena (1996) occupied the third and fourth slots respectively on the Billboard Top Latin Albums chart. Dreaming of You sold 420,500 copies between 1997 and 1999, and sold 190,000 units in 1997 alone. The biopic Selena (1997) contributed to a 65% increase of sales for Dreaming of You for that year. Dreaming of You sold half a million copies in Texas. Some Texas retailers criticized sale figures for the state because the album had sold poorly at their music stores. By December 1995, Dreaming of You had sold two million copies in the U.S. and was certified double platinum by the Recording Industry Association of America (RIAA), signifying shipments of two million copies. Within ten months of its release, the album was nearing triple-platinum status; it was eventually certified 59× platinum (Latin field) by the RIAA, denoting 3.54 million album-equivalent units sold. , it remains the best-selling Latin album of all-time in the U.S. with sales of three million units according to Nielsen SoundScan. It has sold over five million copies sold worldwide as of January 2015. A percentage of the proceeds from the album's sales was donated to the Selena Scholarship Fund.

Outside the U.S.

In Canada, Dreaming of You debuted at number 59 on the RPM Top 100 Albums chart for the week of September 4, 1995. In its second week, it rose to number 50 on the week of September 11, 1995. On its ninth week, Dreaming of You peaked at number seventeen on the week of October 30, 1995. After spending twenty-nine weeks on the chart, Dreaming of You spent its final week at number 97 on the week of March 25, 1996. The album was certified gold by Music Canada, denoting shipments of 50,000 units in that country alone. In Dreaming of You first week of release to music stores in Mexico, EMI shipped 140,000 units there and received re-orders from Monterrey, Guadalajara, and Tijuana.

 Impact 
Dreaming of You sold 175,000 copies on its first day of release in the U.S.a then-record for a female vocalist. The recording also had the highest release-day sales of any Spanish-language album to debut on Billboards Top Latin Albums chart. According to Behar, the sales figures Nielsen SoundScan provided did not include sales in small shops specializing in Latin music, where Dreaming of You scored well. The album's sales helped Selena to become the third solo artist to debut a posthumous album at number one on the U.S. Billboard 200 chart, after Janis Joplin and Jim Croce. It became the first and only Spanish-language and Tejano recording to debut at number one on the U.S. Billboard 200 chart, and the first EMI Latin release to do so.

According to John Lannert of Billboard magazine, Dreaming of You was among the top ten best-selling debuts for a musician, best-selling debut by a female act, and according to Thom Duffy also from Billboard magazine, it was the fastest-selling U.S. 1995 album. It helped Selena to become the fastest-selling female act in recorded music history, and has since been ranked among the best and important recordings produced during the rock and roll era. Dreaming of You joined five of Selena's studio albums on the Billboard 200 chart simultaneously, making Selena the first female act in Billboard history to accomplish this. The album was included on Michael Heatley's list titled Where Were You When the Music Played?: 120 Unforgettable Moments in Music History (2008). Musicologist Howard J. Blumenthal said it "would have made [Selena] a major rock star", and included it in his 1997 book The World Music CD Listener's Guide.

Billboard magazine said Dreaming of You was predominantly purchased by Latinos in the U.S.; demonstrating the purchasing power of Hispanic music consumers. The album was believed to have "open the eyes" of retailers who never stocked Latin music; its sales were well above expectations of white, American music shop owners. Sales of Selena's earlier albums and Dreaming of You prompted Best Buy and other retailers to hire Latin music specialists. Within weeks, the album was predicted to outsell Julio Iglesias' 1100 Bel Air Place (1984), as the largest-selling English-language Latin album. EMI Records announced in the December 2, 1995, issue of Billboard magazine that as EMI's best-selling record in North America, the album gave them the highest sales for a music label during the first half of 1995. With Dreaming of You peaking at number one, Tejano music entered the mainstream market. Music critics said the general population of the U.S. would not have known about Tejano or Latin music had it not been for Dreaming of You. Following the album's release, and because of the singer's death, Tejano music's popularity waned as Latin pop began dominating U.S. radio play and commercial sales. In March 2015, the Chicano Humanities & Arts Council in Denver, Colorado, showcased an exhibit called "Dreaming of You: The Selena Art Show", which prominently featured artwork by Chicano artists who paid homage to the singer.

 Track listing Notes  signifies a language adapter
  signifies a co-writer

 Personnel 
Credits are taken from the album's liner notes.VocalsSelena Quintanilla-Pérez – lead vocals, backing vocals, composer, ideal
Trey Lorenz – backing vocals
David Byrne – vocals, guitar, harmonium, percussion, writer, composer
Barrio Boyzz – vocals and scats on "Wherever You Are"
Full Force – backing vocals, remix producer and arranger, keyboards, drum programming
Mariachi Sol de Mexico – backing vocals
Donna De Lory – backing vocals
Pete Astudillo – tambourine, backing vocals, composerInstrumentalsMarc Antonie – guitars
Dann Huff – guitars
Neil Stubenhaus – bass
Art Meza – percussion
Luis Conte – percussion
Jerry Hey – horns
Dan Higgins – horns
Gary Grant – horns
Bill Reichenbach Jr. – horns
Paul Socolow – bass
Todd Turkisher – drums
Valerie Naranjo – marimba
Ricky Vela – keyboards, drum programming
Joe Ojeda – keyboards
Chris Pérez – guitars
Suzette Quintanilla Arriaga – drums
Nick Moroch – guitarsProducersKeith Thomas – composer, producer
Kit Hain – composer
Tom Snow – composer
Franne Golde – composer
Mark Goldenberg – composer
Diane Warren – composer
K. C. Porter – composer, engineer		
Felipe Valdés Leal – composer
Guy Roche – producer, keyboards, synthesizer
Nathaniel "Mick" Guzauski – mixer
Mario Luccy – engineer
Brian "Red" Moore – engineer, mixer, recorder
Moana Suchard – engineer, assistant engineer
Rhett Lawrence – producer, arranger, keyboards, drums, programming
A.B. Quintanilla III – producer, arranger, bass guitar
Jose Hernandez – arranger, producer
Rokusuke Ei – composer
Hachidai Nakamura – composerEngineeringDelphine – synth programming
Dan Garcia – engineer
Bruce Robb – engineer
Carl Harris Jr – assistant engineer
Joanie Smith – production coordination
Chris Kholer – computer technician
Bob Ludwig – mastering and digital remastering
Arto Lindsay – producer
Susan Rogers – producer, engineer
Kurt Lundvall – assistant engineer
Tim Conklin – additional engineer
Perry Tembelis – assistant engineerMixersMichael Brauer – mixer
Gerry E. Brown – re-mixer
Bill Molina – digital editing
Tony Peluso – mixer
Mike Aavold – mixing assistantArt'
Nancy Brennan – art, concept
José Behar – art direction
Barbie Insua – art direction
Margo Chase – packaging design
Brian Hunt – packaging design
Marucie Rinaldi – photography
John Lannert – biography

Charts

Weekly charts

Year-end charts

Certifications 

!scope="row"|Worldwide
|
|5,000,000 
|-

See also 

 1995 in Latin music
 Selena albums discography
 List of works published posthumously
 List of number-one Billboard Top Latin Albums from the 1990s
 List of number-one Billboard Latin Pop Albums from the 1990s
 List of Billboard 200 number-one albums of 1995
 List of best-selling Latin albums
 List of best-selling Latin albums in the United States
 Latin American music in the United States

Notes

References

Sources 

 - Read online, registration required

External links 
 
 

1995 albums
Albums produced by A.B. Quintanilla
Albums produced by Guy Roche
Albums produced by David Byrne
Albums published posthumously
Crossover (music)
EMI Records albums
EMI Latin albums
Selena albums
Spanish-language albums
Tejano Music Award winners for Album of the Year
Albums recorded at Q-Productions